Todd County is the name of several counties in the United States:

Todd County, Kentucky
Todd County, Minnesota
Todd County, South Dakota